Acontia nitidula, the Brixton beauty, is a moth of the family Noctuidae. The species was first described by Johan Christian Fabricius in 1787. It is found in South Africa, Europe, China, Japan and throughout India and Sri Lanka. It has also been recorded from Great Britain, but this record is doubtful.

The larvae feed on the leaves of Abelmoschus esculentus and cotton and are considered a minor pest.

Occurrence in the British Isles
The occurrence of Acontia nitidula in the British Isles is unconfirmed and highly doubtful. It was included on the British checklist of Lepidoptera species on the basis of a single specimen taken by Mr Plastead, a notorious dealer in rarities, at Brixton in September 1829. It is thought to be deliberately imported and there is no evidence of breeding in the United Kingdom.

References

nitidula
Moths of Europe
Moths of Asia
Moths described in 1787